The flag of the United States Army displays a blue replica of the War Office Seal set on a white field. Beneath the seal is a broad scarlet scroll bearing the inscription in white letters, "United States Army". Beneath the scroll, in blue Hindu-Arabic numerals, is "1775", the year in which the Continental Army was created with the appointment of General George Washington as General of the Army. All of this is on a white background.

The flag was officially adopted by President Dwight D. Eisenhower on June 12, 1956, via .

History 
Prior to 1956 the Army was the only armed service without a flag, official or otherwise, to represent the entire service. In 1955, prompted by the need for a flag to represent the U.S. Army in joint service ceremonies, Secretary of the Army Wilber M. Brucker requested the creation of an army flag.

The U.S. Army flag was dedicated and unfurled to the general public on June 14, 1956, at Independence Hall, Philadelphia, on the 181st anniversary of the establishment of the U.S. Army by the Continental Congress. "United States Army" is inscribed in white letters on a scarlet scroll, with the year "1775" in blue numerals below.

Streamers 
The concept of campaign streamers began during the American Civil War, when the War Department instructed regiments to inscribe the names of their meritorious battles on their national colors. The Army has defined an official campaign as a particular combat action or series of actions that has historical significance or military importance to the United States and the Army.

In 1890, the War Department directed that regimental honors be engraved on silver rings placed on the staffs of regimental flags. In 1920, the War Department ordered that each regimental color would bear streamers, in the colors of the campaign medal ribbon, for each campaign in which the regiment had fought. The creation of the Army flag provided a means to display all the Army's campaigns.

See also 
 Flags of the United States Armed Forces

References

External links 
 United States Army Flag: Short history of Army Flag at the U.S. Army Quartermaster Museum

Heraldry of the United States Army
Army
Flags displaying animals